The column of the Temple of Poseidon is one of the surviving features from the period of the sixth Duke of Devonshire in the Chatsworth House garden. Surmounted by an over life-sized bronze bust of the sixth Duke, the classical Greek column composed of four Doric marble drums was erected in 1840s. It is located at the south termination of the Serpentine Hedge, by the midpoint of a footpath linking between the Maze and the south end of the Broadwalk. The object has been Grade II registered since 1987.

Origin and History 

In today's understanding, the origin of these drums refers to the site of the Temple of Poseidon, Sounion, dated c. 480 BC. However, as can be seen from the object's pedestal inscription whereby its provenance was mistakenly referred to Minerva, the name of this temple was inaccurate in 19th century until 1897, when Valerios Stais’ excavation of this site rediscovered the temple's name and its worshiped deity, Poseidon, God of the Sea. Further research suggests that the four drums are presumably from a single collapsed Poseidon Temple column whose bottom, 3rd, 4th and the 6th drum were stacked in sequence and formed this object. The probable seventh one is preserved in the British Museum.

Some point before 1845 the publication of his handbook, possibly in 1825 when his half brother returned from the voyage, the sixth Duke of Devonshire acquired these ancient Greek drums as a gift from his half brother, Augustus Clifford, who at the time was the captain of HMS Euryalus and collected several antiquities in Greece between 1821-1825, during his military deployment in Mediterranean.

The bronze bust atop is a work of Thomas Campbell commissioned by the sixth Duke during 1822-1823 in his trip to Rome.

Pedestal Inscriptions 
Its 19th-century sandstone pedestal is three-face inscribed:

West 
Such was e’en then their look of calm repose,

As wafted round them came the sound of fight,

When the glad shout of conquering Athens rose,

O’er the long track of Persians broken flight.

North 
These fragments stood on Sunium’s airy steep,

They reared aloft Minerva’s guardian’s shrine,

Beneath them rolled the blue Aegean deep,

And the Greek pilot hailed them as divine.

South 
Tho clasped by prostrate worshippers no more,

They yet shall breathe a thrilling lesson here,

Tho distant from their own immortal shore,

The spot they grace is still to freedom dear.

Reference List 


Ancient Greek buildings and structures
Columns and entablature
Grade II listed buildings in Derbyshire